Calosoma volkensi is a species of ground beetle in the subfamily of Carabinae. It was described by Kolbe in 1895.

References

volkensi
Beetles described in 1895